Emily Carmichael (also known as Emily Bradshaw) is an American novelist, writing romances with both historical and contemporary settings. She lives in Arizona.

Selected bibliography

Hearts of Gold series
 Finding Mr. Right (1999)
 Diamond in the Ruff (2001)
 Gone to the Dogs (2003)
 The Cat's Meow (2004)
 A New Leash on Life (2005)

Other titles
 The Good, the Bad, and the Sexy (2002)
 Becoming Georgia (2003)

References

Living people
20th-century American novelists
21st-century American novelists
Novelists from Arizona
American women novelists
20th-century American women writers
21st-century American women writers
Year of birth missing (living people)